Herbert Reason was an English professional footballer who played in the Football League for Clapton Orient as a left back. He was nicknamed 'Jumbo', "due to his short and stocky build".

Personal life 
Reason was married with three children and worked as a bricklayer. He served as a private in the 1st Football Battalion of the Middlesex Regiment during the First World War.

References

English footballers
English Football League players

Association football fullbacks
British Army personnel of World War I
1884 births
Year of death missing
People from Wanstead
Leyton Orient F.C. players
Middlesex Regiment soldiers
British bricklayers